Tony or Anthony Harris may refer to:

Sports

American football
 Anthony Harris (defensive lineman) (born 1981), American football defensive lineman
 Anthony Harris (linebacker) (born 1973), American football linebacker
 Anthony Harris (safety) (born 1991), American football safety

Other sports
 Anthony Harris (cricketer) (born 1982), New Zealand cricketer
 Tony Harris (sportsman) (1916–1993), South African cricketer and rugby union international
 Tony Harris (athlete) (born 1941), British middle-distance runner in 1962 European Athletics Championships – Men's 800 metres
 Tony Harris (basketball, born 1967) (born 1967), American basketball player
 Tony Harris (basketball, born 1970) (1970–2007), American basketball player
 Tony Harris (footballer) (John Robert Harris, 1922–2000), Scottish footballer

Others
 Anthony Leonard Harris (born 1935), British geologist
 Anthony Charles Harris (1790–1869), collector of ancient Egyptian papyri
 Tony Harris (author) (born 1951), Helm Identification Guides author
 Tony Harris (artist) (born 1969), cartoonist and comic book artist
 Tony Harris (journalist) (born 1959), reporter and news anchor for Al Jazeera English and now Al Jazeera America
 Tony Harris, producer for the album Holy Water by Bad Company

See also
 Tony Harrison (disambiguation)